Louis Bissinger was a French painter born in Lyon on 24 April 1899. He died on February 25, 1978, in Rillieux-la-Pape.

Biography
Louis Bissinger began his career as a musician, playing the cello to make a living. He moved to painting and started with watercolors. He was arrested by the Gestapo in 1943 for helping the French Resistance, and was deported to Germany. He used his painting skills to illustrate the atrocities of concentration camp life in Buchenwald. He survived and organized an exhibition of his war time's artworks when he returned to France.

Notes

External Sources and References
 Benezit Dictionary of Artists

1899 births
1978 deaths
Artists from Lyon
20th-century French painters
20th-century French male artists
French male painters
Modern painters
19th-century French male artists